Poseidon Linux is a Linux distribution, a complete operating system, originally based on Kurumin, now based on Ubuntu. It is developed and maintained by developers located at the Rio Grande Federal University in Rio Grande do Sul, Brazil, and the MARUM institute in Germany.

Naming
The name Poseidon was chosen after the God of the seas in Greek mythology, since a large number of oceanologists have been involved in the development of the system.

History
The 3.x family was pre-presented in 2008 at the 9th Free Software International Forum (FISL9.0),. It was well received by the Linux community, including Jon "maddog" Hall of Linux International.

Poseidon 3.2 was officially released in May 2010 at the IV Brazilian Oceanography Congress, in Rio Grande, Brazil.

For version 4.0, the project changed the base distribution from Knoppix/Kurumin to Ubuntu. This was due to the wide acceptance of Poseidon outside the Portuguese-speaking scientific community, and because of the shut-down of the Kurumin project. The Ubuntu-based releases allow for installation in Portuguese, Spanish, English, German, French, Greek, and other languages.

The development team stated that after Poseidon 5.0, the distribution would focus on bathymetry, seafloor mapping, and GIS software. Many of the bundled CAD and scientific programs were removed, but may be separately available for download from compatible repositories.

The current version of Poseidon is 8.0, and is based on 32-bit and 64-bit Ubuntu 16.04 LTS.

Features
Throughout its release history, the distribution has contained many free software programs used in science and engineering, such as the Fortran programming language, Kile and Lyx for scientific writing, numerical modeling, 2D/3D/4D visualization, statistics, CAD, genetics, bio-informatics, and several tools that support GIS and mapping. Additionally, LibreOffice, web browsers, and multimedia packages are included.

Releases

References

External links

Official/Original site (in Portuguese)
Official site, updated (English)

Article in Pan American Journal of Aquatic Science (in Portuguese) (PDF file)
New article in Pan American Journal of Aquatic Science (in English) (PDF file)

Ubuntu derivatives
Spanish-language Linux distributions
Portuguese-language Linux distributions
Linux distributions